Veta is a 2014 Indian Telugu action film written and directed by Ashok Alle and starring Srikanth, Tarun, Jasmine and Madhurima.

Cast
 Srikanth as Jagan
 Tarun as Karthik
 Nyra Banerjee as Devraj's sister
 Jasmin Bhasin as Sonal
 Ajaz Khan as Devraj
 Deepthi Vajpayee as Pravalika

Soundtrack
Music composed by Chakri. Album consists of 6 songs.
  01 – Yevaro Yevaro – K Hari
  02 – Sarigamale Sarigamale – Kousalya, Hariharan
  03 – Okate Okate Okate – Chakri
  04 – Bavagaru Bavagaru – Geetha Madhuri, Simha
  05 – I Love You Antunna – Kunal Ganjawala
  06 – Katreena Katreena – Uma Neha, M Vasu

References 

2014 films
Indian action thriller films
2010s Telugu-language films
2014 action thriller films